Fluoromethcathinone can refer to several substituted cathinone compounds:

3-Fluoromethcathinone
4-Fluoromethcathinone (flephedrone)